The Upper Midwest is a region in the northern portion of the U.S. Census Bureau's Midwestern United States. It is largely a sub-region of the Midwest. Although the exact boundaries are not uniformly agreed-upon, the region is defined as referring to the states of Michigan, Minnesota and Wisconsin; some definitions include Iowa, North Dakota, South Dakota, and parts of Nebraska and Montana as well.

Definitions
The National Weather Service defines its Upper Midwest as the states of Iowa, Michigan, Minnesota, North Dakota, South Dakota and Wisconsin.

The United States Geological Survey uses two different Upper Midwest regions:

The USGS Upper Midwest Environmental Sciences Center considers it to be the six states of Illinois, Indiana, Iowa, Michigan, Minnesota and Wisconsin, which comprise the watersheds of the Upper Mississippi River and upper Great Lakes.
The USGS Mineral Resources Program considers the area to contain Illinois, Indiana, Michigan, Minnesota and Wisconsin.

The Association for Institutional Research in the Upper Midwest includes the states of Iowa, Minnesota, North Dakota, South Dakota, Wisconsin and the upper peninsula of Michigan in the region. According to the Library of Congress, the Upper Midwest includes the states of Minnesota, Wisconsin and Michigan.

Agriculture
The USDA reported that corn, soybean, sunflower and sugar beet crops saw harvest gains in 2018, but were still below the five-year averages. In North Dakota, for example, 49% of corn was harvested by November 4 compared with the five-year average of 97%. This was in part due to weather conditions in October that affected the harvest.

Climate
The region has dramatic variations between summer and winter temperatures; summers are very hot; and winters are very cold. For example, Sioux Falls averages 25 days each year with temperatures above  and 45 days each year with temperatures below .

The growing season is shorter, cooler and drier than areas farther south and east. The region's western boundary is sometimes considered to be determined by where the climate becomes too dry to support growing non-irrigated crops other than small grains or hay grass.

Language

The Inland North dialect, most prominently characterized by the Northern Cities Vowel Shift, is centered in the eastern part of the Upper Midwest, including Wisconsin, Michigan and the northern parts of Illinois and Ohio; it extends beyond the Midwest into Upstate New York. North Central American English (also known as "Upper Midwestern"), an accent of American English defined more by the absence of certain features than their presence, is spoken in Minnesota, parts of Wisconsin and Iowa, the Upper Peninsula of Michigan, portions of Montana and the Dakotas.

Politics

The Upper Midwest was the heartland of early 20th-century Progressive Party politics and the region continues to be favorable to the Democratic Party and moderate Republicans, with Minnesota favoring each Democratic presidential candidate since 1976 and Wisconsin from 1988 to 2012 (again in 2020). Minnesota narrowly supported native Walter Mondale in 1984 in an election where Ronald Reagan won every other state. Michigan, Illinois and Wisconsin also often favor Democratic candidates. However, beginning with the 2010 midterm elections, Republicans experienced substantial gains in state legislative and executive offices in Iowa, Minnesota, Wisconsin and Michigan. This trend has continued through 2016. In 2020, the region had three Democratic governors (in Minnesota, Michigan, and Wisconsin) and three Republican governors (in North Dakota, Iowa, and South Dakota).

2016 
Donald Trump's 2016 presidential campaign made significant in-roads in the Upper Midwest. Trump won the electoral votes of Iowa, Wisconsin, Michigan, North Dakota and South Dakota, leaving Minnesota the sole blue state in the Upper Midwest in 2016. Hillary Clinton barely won Minnesota, finishing less than two percentage points ahead of Donald Trump.

2020 
In the 2020 presidential election, Democrat Joe Biden won the electoral votes of Wisconsin, Michigan, and Minnesota. Donald Trump won the electoral votes of Iowa, North Dakota, and South Dakota quite easily. Despite Biden winning Wisconsin and Michigan, both states were close, with Biden winning Wisconsin by roughly 20,000 votes and Michigan by 2.8 points.

Each state elects two senators to a six-year term. After the November 2020 Election, Minnesota and Michigan had two Democratic Senators, while North Dakota, South Dakota and Iowa had two Republican Senators. Wisconsin is the only state in the Upper Midwest that has elected one Republican and one Democratic Senator.

Industry and tourism
The economy of the region was largely based upon the mining of iron and copper, as well as a very large timber industry. Mechanization has sharply reduced employment in those areas, and the economy is increasingly based on tourism. Popular interest in the environment and environmentalism, added to traditional interests in hunting and fishing, has attracted a large urban audience who live within driving range.

See also
Louisiana (New France)
Northern Tier (United States)
100th meridian west
Siouxland
Culture:
Culture of Iowa
Culture of Michigan 
Culture of Minnesota
Culture of North Dakota
Culture of South Dakota
Culture of Wisconsin
NFC North, a National Football League division encompassing three of the four teams in the region

References

External links 
The History of the Upper Midwest: An Overview
USGS Upper Midwest Environmental Sciences Center
U.S. Geological Survey's (USGS) Upper Midwest Mineral Resources Program

Regions of the United States
Midwestern United States